Wargo is a lunar crater on the far side of the Moon. It is located to the south of Blazhko, and to the west of Joule.

Wargo is a fresh crater with a prominent ray system.

The crater was unnamed until its name was approved in 2017 by the IAU. It is named after former NASA Chief Exploration Scientist Michael J. Wargo.

References

Further reading

External links 

Impact craters on the Moon
LQ08 quadrangle